Leslie Herbert "Speedy" Duncan (August 10, 1942 – December 9, 2021) was an American professional football player who was a cornerback and return specialist in the American Football League (AFL) and National Football League (NFL). He played college football at Jackson State University. Duncan played seven seasons with the San Diego Chargers, where he was a three-time AFL All-Star. He was also named to the Pro Bowl with the Washington Redskins. Duncan was inducted into the Chargers Hall of Fame and was named to their 40th and 50th anniversary teams.

Playing career
Duncan was a standout player at Druid High School in Tuscaloosa, Alabama. He attended Jackson State University, where he played for the Tigers. Undrafted, he played with the AFL San Diego Chargers from 1964 through 1969, and the NFL Chargers in 1970 and Washington Redskins from 1971 through 1974. He was an AFL All-Star in 1965, 1966, and 1967 and an AFC-NFC Pro Bowler in 1971. He led the AFL in punt return average in consecutive seasons, averaging 15.5 yards per return in 1965 and 13.2 in 1966. 

As a rookie with the Chargers in 1964, Duncan played just a little on defense at safety before becoming a starter at cornerback the following year in 1965 in place of an injured Dick Westmoreland. Playing in Washington under coach George Allen, Duncan became a nickelback, backing up Pat Fischer and Mike Bass, while also returning punts and kickoffs. He led the NFL in punt return average at 10.6 yards per return in 1971. In 1974, he was solely a returner, playing in just two games.

Duncan was inducted into the Chargers Hall of Fame and was named to their 40th and 50th anniversary teams. His 21 interceptions with the Chargers rank seventh in team history. He had three in one game against the Oakland Raiders in 1966, which is tied for the franchise's single-game record. Duncan averaged 12.0 yards per punt return with the Chargers, with career averages of 10.9 on punt returns and 25.2 on kickoffs.

Later years
After his playing career, Duncan returned to San Diego and dabbled in the restaurant business. He also taught at local schools, later moving to Stockton, California, where he was a health and physical education teacher at Webster Middle School.

On December 9, 2021, Duncan died at the age of 79.

See also
 List of American Football League players

References

External links
 
 

 

1942 births
2021 deaths
American Football League All-Star players
American Football League players
American football cornerbacks
American football return specialists
Jackson State Tigers football players
National Conference Pro Bowl players
Players of American football from Alabama
San Diego Chargers players
Sportspeople from Tuscaloosa, Alabama
Washington Redskins players
Schoolteachers from California